Africallagma glaucum is a species of damselfly in the family Coenagrionidae. It is found in Botswana, Gabon, Ghana, Kenya, Malawi, Mozambique, Namibia, Nigeria, Réunion, South Africa, Tanzania, Uganda, Zambia, Zimbabwe, and possibly Burundi. Its natural habitats are subtropical or tropical dry shrubland, subtropical or tropical moist shrubland, subtropical or tropical dry lowland grassland, swamps, intermittent freshwater lakes, intermittent freshwater marshes, and freshwater springs.

References

External links

 Africallagma glaucum on African Dragonflies and Damselflies Online

Coenagrionidae
Odonata of Africa
Insects described in 1839
Taxonomy articles created by Polbot